Scutarcopagia is a genus of bivalves belonging to the subfamily Tellininae of the family Tellinidae.

Species
 Scutarcopagia delicatula (Selli, 1974)
 Scutarcopagia linguafelis (Linnaeus, 1758)
 Scutarcopagia monika M. Huber, Langleit & Kreipl, 2015
 Scutarcopagia nelly M. Huber, Langleit & Kreipl, 2015
 Scutarcopagia pulcherrima (G. B. Sowerby I, 1825)
 Scutarcopagia scobinata (Linnaeus, 1758)
 Scutarcopagia semiaspera (Deshayes, 1855)
 Scutarcopagia squamulosa (A. Adams, 1850)
 Scutarcopagia verrucosa (Hanley, 1844)
Synonyms
 Scutarcopagia lingaefelis [sic]: synonym of Scutarcopagia linguafelis (Linnaeus, 1758) (misspelling)

References

 Okutani T., ed. (2000) Marine mollusks in Japan. Tokai University Press. 1173 pp
 Huber, M.; Langleit, A.; Kreipl, K. (2015). Tellinidae. In: M. Huber, Compendium of bivalves 2. Harxheim: ConchBooks. 907 pp

External links
 Pilsbry, H. A. (1918). Marine mollusks of Hawaii, IV-VII. Proceedings of the Academy of Natural Sciences of Philadelphia. 69 (1): 309-333
 Afshar F. 1969. Taxonomic revision of the superspecific groups of the Cretaceous and Cenozoic Tellinidae. Memoir of the Geological Society of America, 119: 1-215

Tellinidae
Bivalve genera